Conotrachelus elegans, the pecan gall curculio, is a true weevil species in the genus Conotrachelus. It is found in North America where it feeds on galls of the hickory leaf stem gall phylloxera (Phylloxera caryaecaulis), found also on pecan.

References 

 Weevils of South Carolina (Coleoptera: Nemonychidae, Attelabidae, Brentidae, Ithyceridae, and Curculionidae). Janet C. Ciegler. 2010. Clemson University, Clemson, S.C. 276 pp.	
 Guide to insect borers in North American broadleaf trees and shrubs. Solomon, J.D. 1995. USDA Forest Service Agriculture Handbook. 735 pp.	
 The genus Conotrachelus DeJean (Coleoptera, Curculionidae) in the North Central United States. Herbert Frederick (H. F.) Schoof. 1942. University of Illinois press.

External links 
 Conotrachelus elegans at bugguide.net

Molytinae
Beetles described in 1837
Beetles of North America